Aligarh Junction railway station is an 'A' class junction station on the Kanpur–Delhi section of Howrah–Delhi main line and Howrah–Gaya–Delhi line.  It is located in Aligarh district in the Indian state of Uttar Pradesh. It serves Aligarh.

History
Trains started running on the East Indian Railway Company's  Howrah–Delhi line in 1866.

The Bareilly–Moradabad Chord via Rampur, with a branch line to Aligarh, was built by Oudh and Rohilkhand Railway in 1894.

Electrification
The Tundla–Aligarh–Ghaziabad and Aligarh–Harduaganj sectors were electrified in 1975–76.

Infrastructure
There are Seven platforms with two foot bridges. Lift facility is available at platform numbers 2,3&4. A new terminal at city side is under construction.

It also has two double-bedded non-AC retiring rooms.

Accident
Five people were killed and many others injured in an accident at Aligarh railway station on Sunday evening (19 June 2011). The accident took place when a goods train was passing a crowded platform. According to officials, a brake lever snapped from the train and the wheel ploughed into passengers waiting at the platform. There were many people waiting for the Delhi–Tundla passenger train on the platform. The hand brake and the connecting rod had come loose and the protruding object turned deadly for the victims. While two people died on the spot, three others succumbed to their injuries in hospital. At least six other injured people were admitted to Jawahar Lal Nehru Medical College Hospital Aligarh Muslim University.

See also
 Tundla Junction railway station
 Hathras Junction railway station
 Khurja Junction railway station
 Ghaziabad Junction railway station
 Bareilly Junction railway station

References

External links

Railway junction stations in Uttar Pradesh
Railway stations in Aligarh district
Allahabad railway division
Buildings and structures in Aligarh